Mesopediasia is a genus of moths of the family Crambidae.

Species
Mesopediasia hemixanthellus (Hampson, 1896)
Mesopediasia psyche Bleszynski, 1963

References

Natural History Museum Lepidoptera genus database

Crambini
Crambidae genera
Taxa named by Stanisław Błeszyński